Burns is an unincorporated community in northern Eagle County, Colorado, United States.

Description
The community is located along a remote stretch of the Colorado River southwest of Kremmling. It is accessible only by dirt and gravel county roads from State Highway 131 and Interstate 70. The community is located in an arroyo along the river, along the route of the Denver and Rio Grande Western Railroad mainline (now the Union Pacific Railroad) in the sandstone canyons along the Colorado. It consists of a U.S. Post Office (ZIP Code 80426) and a church. Livestock ranching is the primary industry in the surrounding area.

History
The town is named for Jack Burns, a trapper who built a cabin in the area.  The Burns Post Office opened on May 14, 1895.

Geography
Burns is located at  (39.873385,-106.881866).

See also

References

External links

Unincorporated communities in Eagle County, Colorado
Unincorporated communities in Colorado